Celeste Poltera is a Swiss bobsledder who won competed in the late 1980s. He won four medals at the FIBT World Championships with one gold (Two-man: 1987), one silver (Two-man: 1986), and two bronzes (Four-man: 1986, 1987).

References
Bobsleigh two-man world championship medalists since 1931
Bobsleigh four-man world championship medalists since 1930

Living people
Swiss male bobsledders
Year of birth missing (living people)